Mumbai–New Delhi Duronto Express, also known as Mumbai AC Duronto Express, is a 16 Coached fully air-conditioned, non-stop version of Duronto-type service running between  and New Delhi. It is one of the fastest train to connect Maharashtra to Delhi. It is maintained by Western Railways (WR), Mumbai division. This train does not used to make any commercial halts, but now it does make commercial halts at Vadodara, Ratlam and Kota. In the up direction, from New Delhi to Mumbai, the service runs with train number 22210 and in down direction, from Mumbai to New Delhi, as train number 22209. Post extension of Sealdah–New Delhi Duronto to Bikaner, this train is currently the fastest Duronto Express in Indian Railways.

Most of the other Duronto trains take less travel time than their Rajdhani counterparts. Therefore, before the introduction of Mumbai Duronto, it was expected to be the fastest service on the route by many Indian railfans. The Rajdhani Express gets top-most priority on the route, making it the fastest train in the Mumbai–Delhi route. But, the Rajdhani continues to be the fastest as both trains cover the same distance and despite being non-stop service, with no commercial halts, the Duronto takes 40–70 mins more than the Rajdhani.

The maiden run of the train was on 18 March 2012. It ran as 02209 down Mumbai Central–New Delhi Duronto inaugural special express for the very first time and was flagged off by the Mayor of Mumbai, Sunil Prabhu. The first run according to the timetable was done on 20 March 2012, from Delhi to Mumbai. The regular run with the original train numbers was started on 23 March 2012 from Mumbai as 22209.

22210 Mumbai Duronto used to arrive Mumbai Central at 17:00 hrs initially but changes were made and the arrival time at Mumbai was made 45 mins earlier i.e. at 16:15 hrs. Similarly, the down train used to arrive at New Delhi at 16:55 hrs, 10–20 mins early on average, hence, it now officially arrives at New Delhi at 16:30 hrs.

Timetable
22209 down Mumbai Central–New Delhi Duronto Express

22210 UP New Delhi–Mumbai Central Duronto Express

Coach composition
Pure LHB coach in red-grey Rajdhani livery, manufactured in India, are used for this train. Duronto vinyl or wallpaper pasting is done to give the duronto livery, which known as Maa Mati Manush and is designed by former Rail Minister of India, Smt Mamta Bannerjee, who herself was the founder of Duronto Express trains concept.

It comprises 9 Third AC (3A), 3 Second AC (2A), 1 pantry, 1 First AC (1A), 1 Seating cum Luggage Rake and 1 Generator car luggage car guard van, hence, a total of 16 coaches. Maximum 1–2 extra coaches may be added to clear extra rush during holidays

Legends

 Rake composition of 22209

{| class="wikitable"
|- style="background:lightblue;"
! Loco !! 1 !! 2 !! 3 !! 4 !! 5 !! 6 !! 7 !! 8 !! 9 !! 10 !! 11 !! 12 !! 13 !! 14 !! 15 !! 16
|-
|  || LRM1 || B-1 || B-2 || B-3 || B-4 ||  B-5 || B-6 || B-7 || B-8 || B-9 || A-1 || A-2 || A-3 || PC || H-1 || DL-1 |}
 22210- Reverse rake composition of 22209

Locomotive
It is hauled by a Vadodara loco shed-based WAP-5/Vadodara loco shed-based WAP-7 loco end to end.

Halts
It takes three commercial halts in both down and up directions at :-

Speed
The maximum permissible speed of the train is up to 130 kmph except some parts.
	
The maximum permissible speed of the train or the route is 120 kmph between New Delhi (NDLS) and Tuglakabad (TKD) route but RDSO has been requested to corroborate the track quality fit for raising sectional speed to 130 kmph. The maximum permissible speed of the train is 130 kmph in Tuglakabad (TKD) –  Palwal (PWL) – Mathura (MTJ) route where it is slower than the fastest train of the route having speed of 160 kmph. The maximum permissible speed of the train or the route: 130 kmph in Mathura  (MTJ) – Nagda (NAD) – Ratlam (RTM) route, 100 kmph between Ratlam (RTM) and LIMKHEDA but Railway is trying to raise up to 110 kmph in its part between Limkheda and Megnagar and 130 kmph not feasible on Ghat (Hill) section. The maximum permissible speed of the train or the route: 110 kmph between LIMKHEDA and GODHRA (130 kmph not feasible on Ghat section), 130 kmph between GODHRA and VIRAR, 110 kmph in only 26 km long VIRAR – BORIVALI route, 100 kmph in only 30 km long BORIVALI – Mumbai Central (MMCT, formerly BCT) route. 
	
Railway Board has approved the speed policy which envisages operation of passenger trains at 160 kmph on Delhi–Mumbai route but it is still unclear what will its impact on this train in future like increasing of speed but not up to 160 kmph or up to 160 kmph.

Gallery

Other trains
Other trains for Mumbai to Delhi travel and vice versa are  :-
 Firozpur Janata Express
 Chandigarh–Bandra Terminus Superfast Express
 Kochuveli-Dehradun/Amritsar Superfast Express or Chandigarh Sampark Kranti Express
 Swaraj Express
 Lokmanya Tilak Terminus–Haridwar AC Superfast Express
 Paschim Express
 Mangala–Lakshadweep Express
 Maharashtra Sampark Kranti Express
 Mumbai Rajdhani Express
 Bandra Terminus–Hazrat Nizamuddin Garib Rath Express
 Bandra Terminus–Hazrat Nizamuddin Yuva Express
 August Kranti Rajdhani Express
 Thiruvananthapuram Rajdhani Express
 Golden Temple Mail
 Punjab Mail
 Goa Sampark Kranti Express
 Lokmanya Tilak Terminus–Amritsar Express
 Delhi Sarai Rohilla–Bandra Terminus Garib Rath Express
 Bandra Terminus–Haridwar Express
 Lokmanya Tilak Terminus–Hazrat Nizamuddin AC Express

References

 http://www.indianrail.gov.in/train_Schedule.html (type 22209 or 22210 and search)

Sister trains
 August Kranti Rajdhani Express
 Bandra Terminus–Hazrat Nizamuddin AC Superfast Express
 Bandra Terminus–Hazrat Nizamuddin Garib Rath Express
 Bandra Terminus–Hazrat Nizamuddin Yuva Express
 Delhi Sarai Rohilla–Bandra Terminus Garib Rath Express
 Lokmanya Tilak Terminus–Hazrat Nizamuddin AC Express
 Maharashtra Sampark Kranti Express
 Mumbai Rajdhani Express
 Mumbai CSMT–Hazrat Nizamuddin Rajdhani Express

Delhi–Mumbai trains
Duronto Express trains
Rail transport in Maharashtra
Rail transport in Gujarat
Rail transport in Rajasthan
Railway services introduced in 2012